Vernon Township is the name of some places in the U.S. state of Michigan:

Vernon Township, Isabella County, Michigan
Vernon Township, Shiawassee County, Michigan

See also 
 Vernon, Michigan, a village in Shiawassee County
 Vernon Township (disambiguation)

Michigan township disambiguation pages